Laura Daniela Lloreda (born April 30, 1981, in Hato Rey, San Juan, Puerto Rico) holds dual U.S.-Mexican citizenship as a Puerto Rican-born naturalized Mexican citizen and volleyball player in Mexico. She has lived for many years in the state of Veracruz, Mexico, and was on the Mexico national team at various international competitions.

Biography
The daughter of Waldo and Adela Lloreda, Laura Daniela Lloreda spent her childhood in Puerto Rico, but she chose to move to Mexico at age 15, having been offered an opportunity to study at the Universidad de las Americas.
Lloreda later played for the Veracruz team in the Mexico national women's volleyball league, and she earned a spot, after a few months in Mexico, to play for that national team.

In 1996, she led the Mexico national team to a bronze medal at the NORCECA competition, held in the Dominican Republic. In 1997, in front of her Puerto Rican fans, she led the team to a silver medal. In 1998, when the tournament returned to the Dominican Republic, her team also took a silver medal. In 1999, the team finished in sixth place; she was named the tournament's MVP.

In 2001, she went on to Baylor University in the United States, where she excelled right away, leading her team in various categories. She was chosen 2001 Big 12 Conference Newcomer of the Year. On October 22 of that year, she tied a school record, and broke a Big 12 Conference record, by recording nine ace services.
In 2005, she played with her national team at the 2005 Pan-American Cup, finishing with her team in 7th place; that year also participated at the 2005 Summer Universiade.

She played for Llaneras de Toa Baja from the Puerto Rican professional volleyball league for the 2007 season.

Clubs
 Veracruz 
 Llaneras de Toa Baja (2007)

References

See also

List of Puerto Ricans
History of women in Puerto Rico

1981 births
Living people
Mexican women's volleyball players
Puerto Rican women's volleyball players
Baylor University alumni
Sportspeople from San Juan, Puerto Rico
Puerto Rican emigrants to Mexico
Wing spikers
Setters (volleyball)
Puerto Rican expatriate sportspeople in Mexico
Baylor Bears women's volleyball players